Mormoscopa sordescens is a moth of the family Noctuidae first described by Rudolph Rosenstock in 1885. It is known from Australia, including Queensland and New South Wales.

Adults are brown with a pale scalloped margin to each wing.

References

Herminiinae
Moths described in 1885
Moths of Australia